Maryann Plunkett (born c. 1953) is an American actress and singer. Plunkett has performed on the stage both on Broadway and Off-Broadway. She has appeared in the entire play cycle of Richard Nelson's Apple Family Plays. In 1987, she won the Tony Award for Best Leading Actress in a Musical for her performance as Sally Smith in Me and My Girl.

Career
Plunkett graduated from the University of New Hampshire, and was a founding member of Portland Stage repertory company in Maine.

She played on Broadway as Bernadette Peters's replacement in the role of "Dot" in Sunday in the Park with George in 1985.

In 1987, she won the Tony Award for Best Leading Actress in a Musical for her performance as "Sally Smith" in Me and My Girl.

She appeared in the 1991 Broadway revival of Arthur Miller's The Crucible, in which she played Elizabeth Proctor opposite Martin Sheen as John Proctor, in an all-star cast including Michael York and Fritz Weaver. She was part of the Tony Randall National Actors Theatre company, and performed in their production of Saint Joan by Shaw in 1993 on Broadway.

She performed in the National Actors Theatre productions of A Little Hotel on the Side by Georges Feydeau and Maurice Desvallières on Broadway in 1992, and in The Seagull by Anton Chekov in 1992.

Plunkett appeared in the television movies The Littlest Victims and Breaking the Silence, and in feature films including Claire Dolan and The Company Men. She guest-starred on episodes of Matlock, L.A. Law, Murder She Wrote, Miami Vice, Star Trek: The Next Generation, and Law & Order.

Richard Nelson "Apple Family Plays"
She and her husband Jay O. Sanders appeared together in the Richard Nelson play Sorry in 2012 at the Off-Broadway Public Theatre.

She was nominated for the 2013 Drama Desk Award, Outstanding Featured Actress in a Play for her role as "Barbara Apple". Plunkett played the role of "Barbara Apple" in the other Nelson "Apple Family" plays as well. They appeared together in the Off-Broadway production of That Hopey Changey Thing in October 2010 at the Public Theatre.

Plunkett and Sanders appeared in Sweet and Sad in September 2011 at the Public Theatre. Sweet and Sad  won the 2012 Drama Desk Award, Outstanding Ensemble Performance and the 2012 Obie Award, Ensemble Performance. She appeared in The Apple Family Plays in repertory at the Public Theatre, from October 22, 2013 to December 15.

Richard Nelson election trilogy
Plunkett and Sanders appear in all three of Nelson's new play cycle, with the overall title of The Gabriels: Election Year in the Life of One Family. The first play, Hungry, premiered in March 2016 at the Public Theatre. The second play, What Did You Expect? ran at the Public Theatre from September 10, 2016 to October 9. The third and final play, Women of a Certain Age, opened on election night, November 8, 2016 and runs to December 4, at the Public Theatre.

Personal life
She and Jay O. Sanders were married in 1991. They met while acting on the television series A Man Called Hawk. They have a son named Jamie born in 1994.

Work

Stage productions
 1982: Agnes of God
 1985: Sunday in the Park with George
 1986: Me and My Girl
 1991: The Crucible
 1992: A Little Hotel on the Side
 1992: The Master Builder
 1992: The Seagull
 1993: Saint Joan
 2008: A Man for All Seasons
 2013: The Apple Family Plays (in repertory)
 2016: The Gabriels (trilogy)
 2019: The O'Casey Cycle (Juno and the Paycock, The Plough and the Stars)

Filmography
 1989: The Littlest Victims (TV Movie)
 1990: Star Trek: The Next Generation (TV series), episode "Identity Crisis"
 1991: Deceptions: A Mother's Secret
 1992: Breaking the Silence (TV Movie)
 1998: Claire Dolan
 2005: The Squid and the Whale
 2010: The Company Men
 2010: Blue Valentine
 2013: House of Cards Evelyn Baxter (season 1).
 2015: True Story
 2015: The Family Fang
 2019: A Beautiful Day in the Neighborhood
 2019: Manifest (TV series) as Priscilla Landon
 2021: Dr. Death as Madeline Beyer

References

External links
 
 

1950s births
20th-century American actresses
21st-century American actresses
Actresses from Massachusetts
American film actresses
American musical theatre actresses
American stage actresses
American television actresses
Living people
Actors from Lowell, Massachusetts
Singers from Massachusetts
Tony Award winners
University of New Hampshire alumni